Devonport railway station serves the Devonport area of Plymouth in Devon, England. It is managed by Great Western Railway.

History
The station opened with the Cornwall Railway on 4 May 1859. It was described at the time as "built of rubble masonry, in the Italian style of architecture, which style is adopted at all stations on the railway. It consists of an arrival, departure, and goods stations, the two former being stone structures, and the last a wooden erection".

In 1865 the Royal Agricultural Show was held at nearby at Pennycomequick and so the opportunity was taken to enlarge the platforms at Devonport. A "refreshment booth" was also erected for the duration of the show to cater for the large number of visitors expected.

The Cornwall Railway was amalgamated into the Great Western Railway on 1 July 1889. The Great Western Railway was nationalised into British Railways from 1 January 1948 which was in turn privatised in the 1990s.

For a while after 1948 the station was known as Devonport Albert Road to distinguish it from the ex-London and South Western Railway Kings Road station (now the site of the City College Plymouth). The name reverted to just "Devonport" from 6 May 1968.

The goods shed was originally situated in front of the station near the tunnel entrance, but a new goods yard was opened in about 1892 on a larger site east of the station.  This was accessed beneath a girder bridge that carried Valletort Road. The old goods shed and sidings were removed in 1903 and replaced by new sidings which handled milk traffic until 1957.

Valletort Road goods depot was closed in April 1957 and was then used for about forty years by the railway civil engineers.  The station became unstaffed from 19 May 1969.

Location
The station is in a cutting at the top of an incline which climbs up from Plymouth. Immediately to the west of the station the line curves sharply to the right and enters a short tunnel. The entrance is on the platform served by trains to Gunnislake and Saltash. The second platform that is served by trains to Plymouth is reached by a footbridge. To walk to Devonport, turn right out of the station, right again over the tunnel. On reaching the main road the shops and Dockyard are down the hill to your left. The Torpoint Ferry can be reached by turning left out of the station and then following the park down the hill. To walk to Stoke, turn left out of the station and at the main road turn left again.

Services

Signalling 
The station was initially controlled by disc-and-crossbar signals controlled locally. The first signal box opened on 9 November 1877, a 20-lever box with semaphore signals, but it was extended in about 1892 to 29 levers to accommodate the new goods yard at Valletort Road.

The signal box was replaced by a new one in October 1899 when the line was doubled to Keyham.  It closed on 26 November 1960 since when multiple-aspect signals have been controlled by the panel signal box at Plymouth railway station.

Community railway
The railway from Plymouth to Gunnislake is designated as a community railway and is supported by marketing provided by the Devon and Cornwall Rail Partnership. The line is promoted under the "Tamar Valley Line" name. The Lounge pub near Devonport station takes part in the Tamar Valley Line rail ale trail which is designed to promote the use of the line. The line is also part of the Dartmoor Sunday Rover network of integrated bus and rail routes.

See also
 Albert Road Halt railway station (the nearby small LSWR station)
 Railways in Plymouth

References

Further reading

 

Railway stations in Plymouth, Devon
Former Great Western Railway stations
Railway stations in Great Britain opened in 1859
Railway stations served by Great Western Railway
1859 establishments in England
DfT Category F2 stations